The twin-barred tree snake (Chrysopelea pelias) is a species of snake found in Southeast Asia. It is also called the banded flying snake. It can glide, as with all species of its genus Chrysopelea, by stretching the body into a flattened strip using its ribs. It is mostly found in moist forests and can cover a horizontal distance of about 100 metres in a glide from the top of a tree. It is an oviparous snake.

Chrysopelea pelias has an overlapping range with the paradise tree snake (Chrysopelea paradisi) in Malaysia, Singapore, Borneo and Indonesia. However, Chrysopelea pelias is not nearly as common as the paradise tree snake.

Distribution
The twin-barred tree snake is found in
Thailand, Malaysia (Malaya, Penang Island, Pulau Tioman, and East Malaysia), Indonesia (Bangka, Java, Mentawai Archipelago, Natuna Archipelago, Nias, Riau Archipelago, Sumatra, Borneo); Brunei Darussalam; Burma  ;India, Western Ghats Singapore.

References

Further reading
 Boie, F. 1827 Bemerkungen über Merrem's Versuch eines Systems der Amphibien, 1. Lieferung: Ophidier. Isis van Oken, Jena, 20: 508–566.
 Auliya, M. 2006. Taxonomy, Life History, and conservation of giant reptiles in west Kalimantan. Natur und Tier Verlag, Münster, 432 pp.
 Chan-ard,T.; Grossmann,W.; Gumprecht,A. & Schulz,K. D. 1999. Amphibians and reptiles of peninsular Malaysia and Thailand – an illustrated checklist [bilingual English and German]. Bushmaster Publications, Würselen, Germany, 240 pp.
David,P. & Vogel,G. 1996. The snakes of Sumatra. An annotated checklist and key with natural history notes. Bücher Kreth, Frankfurt/M.
 Hien,P. Grossmann,W. & Schäfer, C. 2001. Beitrag zur Kenntnis der landbewohnenden Reptilienfauna von Pulau Tioman, West-Malaysia. Sauria 23 (4): 11–28
 Lim, K.K.P. & Ng, H.H. 1999. The terrestrial herpetofauna of Pulau Tioman, Peninsular Malaysia. Raffles Bull. Zool., Suppl. No. 6: 131–155
 Linnaeus, C. 1758. Systema naturæ per regna tria naturæ, secundum classes, ordines, genera, species, cum characteribus, differentiis, synonymis, locis. Tomus I. Editio decima, reformata. Laurentii Salvii, Holmiæ. 10th Edition: 824 pp.
 Malkmus, R.; Manthey, U.; Vogel, G. Hoffmann, P. & Kosuch, J. 2002. Amphibians and reptiles of Mount Kinabalu (North Borneo). A.R.G. Ganther Verlag, Rugell, 404 pp.
 Malkmus,R. 1985. Amphibien und Reptilien vom Mount Kinabalu (4101 m), Nordborneo. Herpetofauna 7 (35): 6–13
 Manthey, U. & Grossmann, W. 1997. Amphibien & Reptilien Südostasiens. Natur und Tier Verlag (Münster), 512 pp.
 Teo, R.C.H. & Rajathurai, S. 1997. Mammals, reptiles and amphibians in the Nature Reserves of Singapore – diversity, abundance and distribution. Proc. Nature Reserves Survey Seminar. Gardens’ Bulletin Singapore 49: 353–425

Colubrids
Gliding snakes
Snakes of Myanmar
Snakes of Indonesia
Snakes of Malaysia
Snakes of Singapore
Snakes of Thailand
Reptiles described in 1758
Taxa named by Carl Linnaeus
Reptiles of Borneo